The 2020 Ulster Senior Football Championship is the 132nd installment of the annual Ulster Senior Football Championship organised by Ulster GAA. It is one of the four provincial competitions of the 2020 All-Ireland Senior Football Championship. The winners receive the Anglo-Celt Cup. The draw for the championship was made on 9 October 2019.

The BBC showed six televised games live.

The Athletic Grounds in Armagh hosted the final, as the fixture was behind closed doors.

Donegal were the two-time defending champions, but were beaten by Cavan in a repeat of the previous year's final.

Teams
The Ulster championship is contested by the nine county teams in the province of Ulster.

Championship draw

Matches

Preliminary round

Quarter-finals

Semi-finals

Final

See also
 2020 All-Ireland Senior Football Championship
 2020 Connacht Senior Football Championship
 2020 Leinster Senior Football Championship
 2020 Munster Senior Football Championship

Notes

References

External links
 http://ulster.gaa.ie/

2U
2020 in Northern Ireland sport
Ulster Championship
Ulster Senior Football Championship